The men's 5000 meter at the 2014 KNSB Dutch Single Distance Championships took place in Heerenveen at the Thialf ice skating rink on Friday 25 October 2013. There were 20 participants.

Statistics

Result

Source:

Draw

References

Single Distance Championships
2014 Single Distance